USS Sea Devil has been the name of more than one United States Navy ship, and may refer to:

 , later AGSS-400, a submarine in commission from 1944 to 1948, from 1951 to 1954, and from 1957 to 1964
 , a submarine in commission from 1969 to 1991

United States Navy ship names